Salt and Pepper is a 1968 British comedy film directed by Richard Donner and starring Sammy Davis Jr., Peter Lawford, Michael Bates, Ilona Rodgers and John Le Mesurier. It was shot at Shepperton Studios and on location in London and at Elvetham Hall in Hampshire. The film's sets were designed by the art director Don Mingaye. It was followed by a 1970 sequel One More Time directed by Jerry Lewis.

Plot

Chris Pepper (Lawford) and Charlie Salt (Davis) own a nightclub in Swinging London, operating under the suspicious eye of the intrepid Inspector Crabbe.

One night, Pepper finds an Asian girl on the floor of the club. Assuming she's drunk or high, he makes a date with her and thinks she responds. It turns out the girl is dying, and her death sets off a chain of events that puts the unlucky Salt and Pepper onto a plot to overthrow the British government, with the girl's dying words the key.

Cast
 Sammy Davis Jr. as Charles Salt
 Peter Lawford as Christopher Pepper
 Michael Bates as Inspector Crabbe
 Ilona Rodgers as Marianne Renaud
 John Le Mesurier as Colonel Woodstock
 Graham Stark as Sergeant Walters
 Ernest Clark as Colonel Balsom
 Jeanne Roland as Mai Ling
 Robert Dorning as Club Secretary
 Robertson Hare as Dove
 Geoffrey Lumsden as Foreign Secretary
 William Mervyn as Prime Minister
 Llewellyn Rees as 'Fake' Prime Minister
 Mark Singleton as 'Fake' Home Secretary
 Michael Trubshawe as 'Fake' First Lord
 Francesca Tu as Tsai Chan
 Oliver MacGreevy as Rack
 Peter Hutchins as Straw
 Jeremy Lloyd as Lord Ponsonby
 Ivor Dean as Police Commissioner
 Beth Rogan as Greta 
 Calvin Lockhart as Jones 
 Nicholas Smith as Constable

Novelization
About two months before the release of the film, per the era's customary timing, a paperback novelization of the screenplay by Michael Pertwee was released by Popular Library. The book sold extremely well (used and preserved copies are plentiful on the internet) and, commensurate with the film's popularity, went through several printings. The author was Alex Austin (not to be confused with the later novelist of the same name), known most for three bestselling original novels: The Greatest Lover in the World (1956), a satirical fantasy, The Blue Guitar (1960), about an incestuous brother and sister, and The Bride (1964), about the breakdown of a marriage. The same year as his Salt & Pepper novelization, he would publish Eleanore (1969) by Olympia Press. His final novel would be Looking for a Girl (1973) by Dell. Unless he wrote other novelizations pseudonymously, Salt & Pepper was his only media tie-in.

(About Alex Austin) "A native New Yorker, has been a ranch hand, gold prospector and photographer, and he was once voted No. 14 jazz drummer in the country in a Metronome Magazine Poll. He has published fiction, poetry and articles in Harpers, The Saturday Review, Alfred Hitchcock's Mystery Magazine."

References

External links
 
 

1968 films
1960s buddy comedy films
1960s English-language films
1960s spy comedy films
Films directed by Richard Donner
British buddy comedy films
British spy comedy films
Films set in London
1968 comedy films
Films shot at Shepperton Studios
Films scored by John Dankworth
1960s British films